William Ellery Sweet (January 27, 1869 – May 9, 1942) was an American banker and politician who served as the 23rd Governor of Colorado from 1923 to 1925.

Early life and career 
William was born in Chicago, Illinois, on January 27, 1869, to Channing and Emeroy Sweet. His family moved to Colorado Springs, Colorado, in 1872 when William was two. He attended school there, and graduated from high school in 1887. After high school, he went to college in Philadelphia, Pennsylvania, at Swarthmore College. He graduated from Swarthmore in 1890, after three years attending, and earned his Bachelor Degree. He also excelled playing quarterback for the college football team and was a member of Phi Kappa Psi fraternity.

On October 19, 1892, Sweet married Joyeuse L. Fullerton in Philadelphia. After their marriage, William moved to Denver. He decided to start up an investment banking firm, which led the Sweet family to become wealthy, and even let William to retire in 1922. He donated much of his money to charities, including the Denver YMCA.

It wasn't until 1922 that he became active in politics. He joined the Democratic Party, and he gained most of his support from the farm and labor groups. He was a strong advocate against the Ku Klux Klan, which he believed was why he lost the following election to Clarence Morley, because they were a major influence on Colorado politics at the time.

Sweet made two unsuccessful attempts to run for the U.S. Senate in 1926 and 1936.

In the final years of his life, William was a proud supporter of the Progressive Party, and even supported Herbert Hoover's bid for President.

He died on May 9, 1942, in his Denver home. He had a Georgian Revival style mansion in what is now the Humboldt Street Historic District.

References

1869 births
1942 deaths
Democratic Party governors of Colorado
Politicians from Chicago
Politicians from Denver
Candidates in the 1924 United States presidential election
20th-century American politicians
Colorado Progressives (1924)